is a district located in Osaka Prefecture, Japan.

As of 2009, the district has an estimated population of 70,631 and a density of 991 persons per km2. The total area is 71.27 km2.

At one time Peach Aviation had its head office in a location on the property of Kansai International Airport and in Tajiri, in Sennan District.

Towns
Kumatori
Misaki
Tajiri

References

Districts in Osaka Prefecture